Pârâul Porcului may refer to:

 Pârâul Porcului (Bâsculiţa)
 Pârâul Porcului, a tributary of the Dălghiu in Brașov County
 Pârâul Porcului, a tributary of the Putna in Vrancea County